Sorsele is a locality and the seat of Sorsele Municipality in Västerbotten County, province of Lapland, Sweden with 1,277 inhabitants in 2010. Sorsele is also the nearest town to the ski resort Nalovardo. It is known for containing a portion of the Vindelfjällen Nature Reserve, one of the largest nature reserves in Sweden.

Mercedes-Benz operate winter driving events on a series of Hermann Tilke-designed snow/ice courses in the area.

Twin towns
 Kyyjärvi,  Finland

References

Municipal seats of Västerbotten County
Swedish municipal seats
Populated places in Västerbotten County
Populated places in Sorsele Municipality
Lapland (Sweden)

fi:Sorselen kunta